Yogoda Satsanga Society of India (YSS) is a non-profit, nonsectarian spiritual organization founded by Paramahansa Yogananda in 1917 and is a part of the Self-Realization Fellowship which was founded in 1920. The current president of the SRF/YSS is Brother Chidananda. Paramahansa Yogananda is most noted for his 1946 book Autobiography of a Yogi which became an international bestseller and featured in the 100 Most Important Spiritual Books of the 20th Century by HarperCollins.

Overview
YSS's headquarters, Yogoda Satsanga Math, is situated in Dakshineswar, Kolkata, West Bengal with ashrams in Dwarahat, in the state of Uttarakhand, Noida, part of the National Capital Region and Ranchi, in the state of Jharkhand. It has grown to include more than 200 centers around the country. In addition to this, there are twenty-three educational institutions, from primary grades through college level. YSS also has retreat centers in Shimla, Chennai, Pune, Igatpuri, Dihika, Puri, Serampore and Telary in India. YSS's How-to-Live Retreat programs are open to anyone seeking spiritual renewal and who desires to leave behind the pressures of everyday life - even if only for a few days — to deepen their awareness of the Divine. Self-Realization Fellowship, which YSS is a part of, is based at its international headquarters in Mount Washington, Los Angeles, California. Self-Realization Fellowship has over 500 temples, retreats, ashrams, centers, and meditation circles around the world. In the U.S., there are seven temples in California: Berkeley, Glendale, Hollywood, Fullerton, Encinitas, Pacific Palisades, and San Diego. In Arizona there is a temple in Phoenix. Retreat centers are located in Pacific Palisades, California (Lake Shrine), Encinitas, California, Valley Center, Greenfield, VA (Front Royal). In Europe, there is a retreat center in Bermersbach, Germany. There is also a retreat in Armação, Brazil. There are meditation centers and YSS circles located in 54 countries.

Yogoda, a word coined by Yogananda, is derived from Yoga, union, harmony, equilibrium; and da, "that which imparts". "Satsanga" is composed of Sat, truth and Sanga, fellowship.

Paramahansa Yogananda started a small ashram in Dihika, West Bengal (near Asansol), in 1917 prior to moving to Ranchi, where he established and developed his first major ashram in India. The original site where Paramahansa Yogananda started Dihika ashram, has been purchased in 1992 by Yogoda Satsanga Society of India and is being maintained by them as a heritage site of the organization. "In 1997 YSS started a Kendra here. Soon thereafter, a charitable homeopathic dispensary was added. From mid 2010, this Kendra was slowly remodeled into a retreat center with a boundary wall and a guesthouse. Subsequently, the work of constructing a Dhyana Mandir — with an accommodation for about 75 devotees — has been completed at this site."

India's Commemorative Stamp - 100th Anniversary of YSS 
On March 7, 2017, the Prime Minister of India, Narendra Modi released the commemorative postage stamp honoring the 100th anniversary of the Yogoda Satsanga Society of India, founded by Yogananda. The Prime minister stated that though Paramahansa Yogananda left the shores of India to spread his message, he always remained connected with India.

Ashrams, retreats and other facilities
Yogoda Satsanga Society of India oversees more than 180 Kendras, Mandalis, Retreats, Ashrams throughout India and Nepal where weekly services, group meditations, and other programmes are held. Sunday School classes for children are also offered at many locations.

Ashrams
Dakshineshwar Ashram: Paramahansa Yogananda wrote to Rajarsi Janakananda from Calcutta during his visit to India in 1935–36, "You would be pleased to know that I have been working incessantly for creating a permanent centre in Calcutta, the crown city of Bengal, and I think I am almost successful."

In 1946 Yogananda wrote in his Autobiography of a Yogi, "A stately Yogoda Math in Dakshineswar, fronting the Ganges, was dedicated in 1939. Only a few miles north of Calcutta, the hermitage affords a haven of peace for city dwellers. The Dakshineswar Math is the headquarters in India of the Yogoda Satsanga Society and its schools, centres, and ashrams in various parts of India."

Ranchi Ashram: It was here, in Ranchi, in 1917, that Paramahansa Yogananda began his life's work with the founding of an ashram and a "How-to-Live" school for boys, and to make available the universal teachings of Kriya Yoga. The living quarters of great Guru during the early years is preserved as a shrine. The room is open to all for private meditation throughout the day.

Dwarahat Ashram: The YSS Ashram is located about 1.5 km from the Dwarahat town, in Almora district of Uttarakhand State and is surrounded by pine forest on all sides. On the way from town to the Ashram, to the right is the Government Rest House where Sri Daya Mataji had stayed during her visit to Mahavatar Babaji's cave in 1963-64 as the YSS ashram had not been built then.

Noida Ashram: Yogoda Satsanga Sakha Ashram - Noida was inaugurated in January 2010 after the completion of its first phase of construction. Built on a 5-acre plot barely 4 km from the Delhi-U.P border, this phase consists of an Administration Block and two Retreat Blocks.

Publications
Yogoda Satsanga Ranchi Ashram has a full-fledged publication facility which published and distributes the spiritual books of Paramhansa Yogananda and other YSS leaders. It also publishes the quarterly Yogoda Satsanga Magazine.

Retreats
Yogoda Satsanga Society of India's How-to-Live Retreat programmes are open to anyone.

Bibliography

See also 
 Lahiri Mahasaya
 Rajarsi Janakananda
 Self-Realization Fellowship Lake Shrine
 Yukteswar Giri

References

External links 

 

Paramahansa Yogananda
1917 establishments in India
Hindu new religious movements
Hindu religious orders
International Hindu organizations
Book publishing in India
Religious organisations based in India
Religious organizations established in 1917
Yoga organizations